William G. Donnan (June 30, 1834 – December 4, 1908) was an American lawyer, Civil War officer, politician who served as a two-term Republican U.S. Representative from Iowa's 3rd congressional district.

Early life and education 
Born in West Charlton, a hamlet in Saratoga County, New York, Donnan attended the district schools and Cambridge Academy. He graduated from Union College in Schenectady, New York, in 1856.

Career 
He moved to Independence, Iowa, in 1856. After studying law, he was admitted to the bar in 1856, and commenced practice at Independence in 1857. From 1857 to 1862, he was the treasurer and recorder of Buchanan County, Iowa.

In 1862, he entered the Union Army as a private in Company H, 27th Iowa Volunteer Infantry Regiment. He was promoted to the grade of first lieutenant and brevetted captain and major. He was adjutant on the staff of Gen. James Isham Gilbert. His hundred twenty-eight letters written to his wife Mary during the War are a valuable historical resource.

Following the war, he was elected to the Iowa Senate, initially serving in 1868 and 1870. He was largely instrumental in securing the establishment of the Mental Health Institute (formerly called the Iowa State Hospital for the Insane) at Independence.

In 1870, incumbent Republican Third District Congressman William B. Allison focused on winning election to the U.S. Senate, and thus declined to seek re-election to his House seat. Donnan was elected as a Republican to succeed him, serving in the 42nd United States Congress. Donnan was re-elected two years later (in 1872), to serve in the Forty-third Congress. He declined to be a candidate for reelection in 1874.

Later career 
After his term ended, he resumed the practice of law at Independence, and remained active in politics. He was again elected to the Iowa Senate, serving from 1884 to 1886. He served as delegate-at-large to the 1884 Republican National Convention, and as chairman of the Republican State Central Committee from 1884 to 1886.

He later became president of the First National Bank of Independence.

Death 
He died in Independence, on December 4, 1908. He was interred in Oakwood Cemetery. The now-disincorporated town of Donnan, Iowa, in Fayette County was named for him.

References

1834 births
1908 deaths
Iowa lawyers
People of Iowa in the American Civil War
Union Army officers
Republican Party Iowa state senators
Union College (New York) alumni
People from Charlton, New York
County treasurers in Iowa
People from Independence, Iowa
Republican Party members of the United States House of Representatives from Iowa
19th-century American politicians